Xylosandrus morigerus, is a species of weevil widespread throughout Afrotropical, Australian, Neotropical, Oceania and Oriental regions. It is also introduced to Palearctic regional countries.

Distribution
It is native to Gabon, Madagascar, Mauritius, Zaire, Australia, New Guinea, Solomon Islands, India, Sri Lanka, Indonesia, Malaysian Peninsula, Philippines, Taiwan, Vietnam, Brazil, Colombia, Costa Rica, Galapagos Islands, Honduras, Mexico, Panama, Puerto Rico, Tobago, Venezuela, Fiji islands, Hawaii, Micronesia, Samoa, and Tonga. It is also found in Austria, Czech republic, United Kingdom, France, Italy, Jordan and Lebanon as an exotic species.

Description
Body length of the female ranges from 1.5 to 2.0 mm. Body light to dark brown. Antennae and legs are yellowish brown. Antennea with 5 funicular segments and obliquely truncate club. Pronotal vestiture is semi-appressed and with hairy setae. Pronotal base covered with a dense patch of short erect setae that resemble a pronotal-mesonotal mycangium. Pronotal disc is moderately punctate. Pronotum consists with lateral costa and carina. Protibiae with 4 socketed teeth, whereas mesotibiae with 8 to 10 and metatibiae with 10 socketed teeth. In elytra, discal striae and interstriae uniseriate are punctate. Declivital elytral face is convex, steep and abruptly separated from disc.

Biology
The species shows successful inbreeding. Mating occurs between siblings and before dispersal, which assures successful insemination of most dispersing females. Females that are not inseminated by a brother called haplodiploid, can potentially mate with a haploid son produced from unfertilized eggs before leaving the nest. The genetic variation suggests that outbreeding is extremely rare in the species.

A polyphagous species, it is found in many plants. It shows a tight symbiosis with ambrosia fungi such as Ambrosiella and occasionally other imperfect ascomycete fungi.

Host plants

 Acacia gaumeri
 Acalypha
 Actinophora fragrans
 Adenanthera pavonina
 Albizia glauca
 Albizia procera
 Alseis yucatanensis
 Altingia excelsa
 Arthrophyllum diversifolium
 Amomum
 Aspidosperma
 Astronium graveolens
 Bixa orellana
 Boehmeria
 Bridelia
 Brosimum alicastrum
 Bursera simaruba
 Butea monosperma
 Calamus caesius
 Calophyllum brasiliense
 Camellia sinensis
 Cassia multijuga
 Castanea argentea
 Castanopsis
 Cattleya
 Cedrela odorata
 Cecropia obtusifolia
 Ceiba pentandra
 Centrosema plumieri
 Chrysophyllum cainito
 Cinchona 
 Claoxylon polot
 Clidemia hirta
 Cocos nucifera
 Coffea arabica
 Coffea excelsa
 Coffea liberica
 Cola acuminata
 Cordia dodecandra
 Crotalaria anagyroides
 Crotalaria usaramoensis
 Dalbergia latifolia
 Dendrobium phalaenopsis
 Dendrobium superbum
 Dendrobium veratrifolium
 Derris microphylla
 Didymopanax 
 Dryobalanops oblongifolia
 Endospermum diadenum
 Epidendrum stamfordianum
 Erythrina lithosperma
 Erythroxylum novogranatense
 Esenbeckia pentaphylla
 Eupatorium pallescens
 Eusideroxylon zwageri
 Falcataria moluccana
 Ficus ampelos
 Flemingia strobilifera
 Freycinetia hombroni
 Fuchsia
 Glochidion
 Grewia laevigata
 Gynotroches onilaris
 Hevea brasiliensis
 Intsia palembanica
 Lecythis
 Leucaena glauca
 Licania hypoleuca
 Lonicera caprifolium
 Macaranga 
 Machaerium cirrhiferum
 Marumia muscosa
 Melia azedarach
 Miconia trinervia
 Mitrella kentii
 Ochroma lagopus
 Persea gratissima
 Phalaenopsis 
 Pometia pinnata
 Pouteria sapota
 Quararibea 
 Renanthera storiei
 Sambucus javanica
 Schizolobium parahyba
 Schleichera oleosa
 Serjania
 Shorea leprosula
 Spondias mombin
 Swietenia macrophylla
 Swietenia mahagoni
 Syzygium polyanthum
 Tabebuia rosea
 Tarenna incerta
 Tectona grandis
 Tephrosia maxima
 Tephrosia vogelii
 Thea sinensis
 Theobroma cacao
 Terminalia amazonia
 Trema micrantha
 Trema orientalis
 Vanda coerulea
 Vanda teres
 Vanda tricolor
 Vitis

References 

Curculionidae
Insects of Sri Lanka
Beetles described in 1894